Likens is a surname. Notable people with the surname include:

Gene Likens (born 1935), American limnologist and ecologist
Jeff Likens (born 1985), American ice hockey defenseman
Rob Likens (born 1967), American football coach
Sylvia Likens (1949–1965), American murder victim